Resaca is an unincorporated community in Monroe Township, Madison County, Ohio, United States.

Resaca was never platted, but the Resaca Post Office was established on March 16, 1887. In 1915, the community had two general stores, one blacksmith, one physician, a poolroom and a population of 30. The post office was discontinued on December 15, 1905. The mail service is now sent through the Plain City branch.

References 

Unincorporated communities in Madison County, Ohio
Unincorporated communities in Ohio